Arild Andresen may refer to:
 Arild Andresen (sportsman) (1928–2008), Norwegian football and ice hockey player
 Arild Andresen (director) (born 1967), Norwegian film director